Sailing/Yachting is an Olympic sport starting from the Games of the 1st Olympiad (1896 Olympics in Athens, Greece). With the exception of 1904 and possibly the canceled 1916 Summer Olympics, sailing has always been included on the Olympic schedule. The Sailing program of 1996 consisted of a total of ten sailing classes (disciplines). For each class, with the exception of the Soling, eleven races were scheduled from 22 July to 2 August 1996 off the coast of Savannah at the Wassaw Sound (an area of the Atlantic Ocean). For the Soling ten fleetraces were scheduled followed by a series of matchraces for the top 6 boats of the fleetrace result.

Venue 

According to the IOC statutes the contests in all sport disciplines must be held either in, or as close as possible to the city which the IOC has chosen. An exception was made for the Olympic yachting events, which customarily must be staged on the open sea. On account of this principle, the city of Savannah was chosen for the organization of the sailing events. Spectators were given the opportunity to board boats that will sail out to the courses to provide a close look at the competition. About 1000 spectators per day made use of the opportunity.

The sailing events were held off the coast of Savannah at the Wassaw Sound and the Atlantic Ocean. The venue used three locations: 
 Satellite Olympic Village in Savannah
 Olympic marina on Wilmington Island. The Stars and Solings, were towed between the Olympic marina and their race areas.
 Day marina, a temporary barge system (14,000 m2) near the north side of Wassaw Sound at the mouth of the Wilmington River. The day marina was used as a forward launch area for the dinghies and windsurf boards.

Separate course areas were used for the following pairs of classes:
 Mistral one-design (men and women)
 Europe and Laser
 Finn and Star
 470 (men and women)
 Tornado and Soling (fleetracing)
 Soling (matchracing)

Competition

Overview

Continents 
 Africa
 Asia
 Oceania
 Europe
 Americas

Countries

Classes (equipment)

Medal summary

Women's events

Men's events

Open events

Medal table

Remarks

Wildcards 
After the qualification was finished the following sailors were granted a wildcard:
  - Mistral One Design Men, (No show)
  - Mistral One Design Men, Cristian Ruata (45th)
  - Mistral One Design Men, I Gusti Made Oka Sulaksana (13th)
  - Mistral One Design Men, Arun Homraruen (21st)
  - Laser, Brett Chivers, (44th)
  - Laser, Luca Belluzzi (56th)
  - Laser, (No show)
  - 470 Men, Pedro Fernández & Angel Alfredo Jimenez (26th)
  - 470 Men, (No show)

Incidents 

 The Olympic sailing facility at Savannah was before the opening of the Olympic Games (10 July) within the Hurricane Bertha warning area. Tornados, Stars and Solings were moved to the Sheraton facility. The Day Marina and the Sheraton were evacuated; the evacuation was complete by 6 PM.

Weather conditions 
The winds on a typical day in Savannah begin is as follows:
 In the morning a light breeze from the west to the Northwest at about 5 knots
 The winds diminish in the late mornings
 By midday, the sea breeze circulation begins. When the sea breeze does rise, the winds backs to the south and Southeast
 Wind speed in the afternoon average between 7 and 12 knots

Olympic weather reports were provided by the National Weather Service from the locations Atlanta and Savannah. Doppler weather radar was used from Charleston, South Carolina. From Jacksonville, Florida the weather above the offshore courses was observed.

Sailors 
During the Sailing regattas at the 1996 Summer Olympics among others the following persons were competing in the various classes:

Notes

References 
 
 
 
 
 
 

 
1996 Summer Olympics events
1996
1996 in sailing